Nantwich Urban District is a former Urban District in Cheshire, based in the town of Nantwich. It was created in 1894 and abolished in 1974 when it was incorporated into the Borough of Crewe and Nantwich, which was itself abolished in 2009. 

The archives, reference NUN, are with Cheshire Archives and Local Studies: some details on the Access to Archives website .

Districts of England created by the Local Government Act 1894
Districts of England abolished by the Local Government Act 1972
History of Cheshire
Urban districts of England
Former districts of Cheshire
Nantwich